Ladislav Demšar (March 3, 1928 – May 15, 1992) was a Yugoslav basketball player and coach. He represented the Yugoslavia national basketball team internationally.

Playing career 
Demšar played for Egység from Novi Sad and Crvena zvezda from Belgrade. He missed entire 1953 season.

In July 1950, he was a member of the Zvezda squad that won an international cup tournament in Milan, Italy.

National team career
As a player for the Yugoslavia national basketball team Demšar participated in 1950 World Championship and three European Championships, 1947 in Prague, 1953 in Moscow and 1955 in Budapest. He played 79 games for national team. During EuroBasket 1947, on 13 May 1947 he score 42 points on 90–13 win against Albania national team and set national team scoring record.

Coaching career 
Demšar coached Vojvodina women's team from Novi Sad. Also, he coached Yugoslavia women's national team and won bronze medal at 1970 European Women's Championship in Rotterdam.

Personal life 
Demšar's wife was Marija Veger (born 1947), a former basketball player who played for Vojvodina and the Yugoslavia national team

Career achievements and awards 
Player
 Yugoslav Men's League champion: 7 (with Crvena zvezda: 1948, 1949, 1950, 1951, 1952, 1954, 1955).
Coach
 Yugoslav Women's League champion: 2 (with Vojvodina: 1969, 1970)

See also 
 List of KK Crvena zvezda players with 100 games played
 List of Yugoslav First Federal Basketball League annual scoring leaders

References

External links 
 Na današnji dan: Rođen Ladislav Demšar, mojacrvenazvezda.net 

1920s births
1992 deaths
1950 FIBA World Championship players
Hungarians in Vojvodina
KK Crvena zvezda players
KK Vojvodina coaches
Serbian men's basketball players
Serbian men's basketball coaches
Serbian expatriate basketball people in Italy
Yugoslav men's basketball players
Yugoslav basketball coaches
Basketball players from Novi Sad
Centers (basketball)